Government Junior College is a state-run co-aid college located in the campus of Government Autonomous College, Rourkela. The junior college is affiliated to Council of Higher Secondary Education, Odisha which prepares students  for class 11th and 12th examination conducted by CHSE board in the course subjects of science, commerce and arts.

References

See also
 Municipal College, Rourkela
 Sushilavati Government Women’s Junior College, Rourkela

Department of Higher Education, Odisha
Junior colleges in India
High schools and secondary schools in Odisha
Schools in Rourkela
Educational institutions established in 1961
1961 establishments in Orissa